Aquavit may refer to:

 Aqua vitae, Latin for "water of life", a concentrated alcoholic distillate
 Akvavit, a Scandinavian distilled beverage 
 Okovita, a historic Polish-Ukrainian term for an alcoholic drink related to vodka
 Restaurant Aquavit, a Scandinavian restaurant in New York